John Francis Williams (November 15, 1905 – October 19, 1985) was an American percussionist from the early 1930s to the late 1950s. In New York and Hollywood he worked on radio, in films, and as a recording artist.

He is the father of film score composer and Boston Pops laureate conductor John Williams, and a grandfather of singer Joseph Williams and pianist/composer Paula Arlich.

Raymond Scott Quintette
Scott was a notorious perfectionist, demanding retake after retake in the rehearsal studio. About this process, Williams told historian Michèle Wood, "All he ever had was machines, only we had names." Williams, explaining Scott's (commercially successful) penchant for recording rehearsals and using the reference discs to develop and finalize his compositions, said, "He didn't write anything, but he edited everything. We would work these things up and we would never change them, ever. We had to do them note for note. It was highly unsatisfactory, and it sold like hell."

Scott painted "portraits in jazz", or "descriptive jazz" — what he felt were musical vignettes of colorful evocations, such as "Reckless Night on Board an Ocean Liner" and "Celebration on the Planet Mars". Williams considered it undignified, but admittedly lucrative. "We really didn't want to do any of it," he told Wood. "We thought [it] was descriptive, all right, but not jazz, because jazz is right now, not memorized note for note. And after all this compulsive rehearsal, suddenly it all caught on and we were making more money than anybody else in town, all thanks to him. We were doing records, public appearances, making movies, everything." Williams also acknowledged a performance dividend. "All that discipline helped ... It had to. I developed a technique way beyond what I'd had", he told Wood.

Scott and his band returned to New York in 1938, allegedly due to the leader's disgust at Hollywood culture ("They think everything is 'wonderful'," he told an interviewer). After dissolving his Quintette in 1939, Scott formed a swing-fashioned big band. Williams remained with the bandleader for at least one incarnation of Scott's newly constituted orchestra. (Scott re-formed the Raymond Scott Quintet [sic] in 1948, but Williams was not involved.)

Professional history
Throughout his association with Scott, Williams continued as an in-demand drummer for the CBS radio network. His assignments included playing for bands led by Benny Goodman, Tommy Dorsey, Vincent Lopez, Leo Reisman, Jacques Renard, and Alfonso D'Artega. He drummed for singer Kate Smith's radio program and in Mark Warnow's orchestra on the long-running radio program Your Hit Parade in the 1930s and 1940s. (Note: Warnow was Scott's older brother.)

When Your Hit Parade moved to California in 1948, Williams relocated to the west coast. In Hollywood he found session work in films, performing for Columbia Pictures in soundtrack orchestras for such films as On the Waterfront, Picnic, and From Here to Eternity. In the 1953 film Let's Do It Again, he "ghost-drummed" for actor Ray Milland.

References

External links
, 1937 photo

1905 births
1985 deaths
American session musicians
Vocalion Records artists
American jazz drummers
People from Watertown, Massachusetts
20th-century American drummers
American male drummers
Jazz musicians from Massachusetts
20th-century American male musicians
American male jazz musicians